The history of Swansea in South Wales covers a period of continuous occupation stretching back a thousand years, while there is archaeological evidence of prehistoric human occupation of the surrounding area for thousands of years before that.

Swansea – occupying a position at the mouth of the River Tawe and adjacent to an extensive bay at the western end of the Bristol Channel – was the main town of its region for much of the Mediaeval period. In the 18th century, local dignitaries attempted to establish it as a tourist resort. The town achieved greater prominence with the onset of the Industrial Revolution. Mirroring similar population explosions in the South Wales Valleys, Swansea's population rose from 6,000 to 17,000 between the Censuses of 1801 and 1851. Industry grew throughout the 19th century, drastically changing the geography of the town and its surroundings. In the 20th century, industry declined but the town continued to grow in population. Swansea officially gained city status in 1969.

Early history
The oldest known remains on the Gower Peninsula are the Red Lady of Paviland: human bones dating from 22,000 BC. Later inhabitants also left their mark on the land. Examples include the Bronze Age burial mound at Cillibion and the Iron Age hill fort, Cil Ifor. Isolated prehistoric artifacts have been found in the area the city proper occupies, but there are far more on Gower. The remains of a Roman villa were also excavated on Gower.

The Welsh name, Abertawe, translates to mouth of the Tawe. It first appears 1150 as Aper Tyui.

Medieval Swansea

By the late 10th century, the region, including the land around the bay and the Gower, was part of the Welsh kingdom of Deheubarth under Maredudd ap Owain. The Vikings arrived sometime between the 9th and 11th centuries, leaving behind their name for a settlement in the area. The precise nature and location of this settlement are still disputed. Spellings such as Swensi, Sweni and Svenshi are found on coins minted around 1140,

In the wake of the Norman Conquest and Norman invasion of Wales, Gower became a marcher lordship which included not only the peninsula itself but also the land to the east as far north as the River Amman and east to the River Tawe. This included the site of Swansea town, which was designated the capital of the area. Although Kilvey Hill is to the east of the Tawe, the manor of Kilvey was also associated with Gower. The new Norman lords encouraged English immigration into the area. This immigration was largely from the West Country.

A turf and timber motte and bailey castle was erected in Swansea in 1106 and was assailed by the local Welsh ten years later (and several more times in the following century). The original castle was subsequently rebuilt in stone. The Braose family—memorialised in local placenames and road names today as de Breos—possessed Gower in the 13th century but preferred to live at Oystermouth Castle. The Gower lordship seems not to have been the main priority of most of the family, who took a full share in the robust politics of the day: see Reginald de Braose, John de Braose, and William de Braose for further details.

The port and industrialisation
The South Wales Coalfield reaches the coast in this region, and coal was being exported by the year 1550, along with great quantities of limestone, quarried in the Mumbles area and on Gower and in high demand as fertiliser. Swansea was already a significant port, and although it was small (perhaps 1000 people in 1560), it had one of the earliest town charters granted in Wales and a constant influx of migrants from the Welsh countryside: this influx occasioned a protest from the borough of Swansea in 1603 (Davies, p267).

The population at this time was concentrated around the castle and river.  Despite small-scale coal mining, the bulk of the area beyond the town was still largely farmland. Swansea Bay was considered an attractive region. In the 18th century, some local notables wanted to direct future development into promoting it as a resort. Their plans were frustrated by the rapid development of industry in the area.

By weight, more coal than copper ore is needed for the process of smelting copper from the ore, so it is more economical to build the smelter near the coal source. Swansea had very local mines, a navigable river, a nearby supply of limestone (necessary as flux), and trading links across the Bristol Channel to Cornwall and Devon, sources of copper ore.

As the Industrial Revolution took off, a series of works were built along the Tawe river from 1720 onwards and a series of mines were opened. Initially, the smelting works concentrated on copper.  Coal was brought down to them by waggonways and tramways; copper ore was brought on ships which could sail right up to the works; the resulting copper was exported out again. Swansea had become "Copperopolis", processing at its peak as much as 70% of the world's copper, and the lower Tawe valley became a mass of industry.

More and more riverside wharfs were built. Tramways, waggonways and railways proliferated and connected the different works and the collieries supplying them. Today's Hafod was originally the village of Vivianstown (Vivian & Sons owned the Hafod Copper Works); and Morriston was founded c. 1790 (the exact date is unclear) by the Morris family who owned the Cambrian Works among other properties. "By 1750, the Swansea district was providing half the copper needs of Britain" (Davies, p 316).

The Cambrian Works closed down as a smelter but reopened as the Cambrian Pottery in 1764: pottery-making is another industry which requires vast quantities of coal (available locally) and clay and flint (available from the West Country, readily accessible by water). The Glamorgan Pottery was founded in 1813 by the ex-manager of the Cambrian Pottery, right next door to it and in direct competition with it. Not only the managers of the potteries but many of the workers came originally from Staffordshire. From 1814 to about 1822 the Cambrian made fine porcelain with excellent overglaze enamel painting, mostly of flowers.  Examples of Swansea pottery can be seen today at the Glynn Vivian Art Gallery and at Swansea Museum

One of the most well-known pieces of Swansea's history began life at this stage: the Mumbles Railway. This started in the first decade of the 19th century as an industrial tramway: a horse pulling a cart along tram plates. It had a specific branch line into Clyne valley where Sir John Morris, one of the railway's owners, owned coal mines. Despite some early journeys made by tourists, it was not until the 1860s that the railway began to carry passengers regularly, by which time it had acquired rails instead of tram plates.

As the town expanded, gates put up by the local turnpike trust were no longer on the outskirts of town but in the town itself. Originally travel between Swansea and other towns or villages had involved paying tolls. Now, travel around the town itself required toll money. This was naturally an unpopular development, and in 1843, Swansea inhabitants made their own contribution to the Rebecca Riots, burning the Ty Coch gate in St Thomas. In the same year, workers from all the copper works in Swansea went on strike after their wages were cut. They returned to work five weeks later, having failed to restore their wages. The strike must have been born of desperation. It was known that John Henry Vivian, one of the owners of the copperworks, was no supporter of workers' rights: he had blacklisted men involved in earlier disturbances.

Civil disturbances were a regular feature of the 1840s in Swansea. This was the period of the Rebecca Riots, of Chartism in the valleys to the east with the Merthyr Rising and the Newport Rising, and general discontent. Huge crowds would gather when those suspected of involvement in Rebecca activities were brought to the station house, and the riot was provoked when one suspect was arrested on the Sabbath (Molloy). At this time, Colonel James Frederick Love commanded militia who were billeted in Swansea, and (in 1843):

Colonel Love had serious problems in deciding how best to stretch his resources. And stretched they were, because it was equally clear that Swansea needed to be strongly garrisoned to cope with violent incursions by unemployed coal and iron workers and discontented country-people, as would Llanelli when the Gwendraeth Valley troubles reached their climax in the following two months. And all the time the Chartist threat hung over the industrial areas to the east.

In this early part of the 19th century, the area which is now Brynmill, Sketty, the Uplands and the university campus was where several of the owners of the "manufactories" lived, in large park-like estates well to the west of the Tawe. The workers were crammed along the banks of the Tawe and lived in poor conditions. The prevailing wind carried the smoke from the copper works to the east, towards St Thomas and Kilvey.  A contemporary report written by a doctor describing Swansea Valley speaks of a nightmare landscape, "literally burnt" where few plants would grow, dotted with lifeless pools, slag heaps, mounds of scoriae and smoke from the works everywhere. George Borrow, later to write and publish his Wild Wales, visited the town in the same year, describing it slightly less emphatically as "a large, bustling, dirty, gloomy place". He was not convinced that Swansea people were in fact Welsh. "The women had much the appearance of Dutch fisherwomen; some of them were carrying huge loads on their heads."

The population of the town of Swansea had already increased from 6000 in 1801 to 17,000 in 1851 (Campbell). By 1881, the borough's population was over 65,000. Much of the growth was due to immigration - in 1881 more than a third of the borough's population had been born outside Glamorgan, and just under a quarter outside Wales.

Writing in 1860, John Murray reports To the traveller who crosses the Llandore bridge at night, the livid glare from the numerous chimneys, the rolling, fleecy, white clouds that fill up the valley beneath him, the desolate-looking heaps of slag on either side, might well recalls Dante's line  - "voi che entrate lasciate ogni speranza"  and records there are no trees,  and instead of grass a yellow sickly growth of chamomile scarcely covers the ground.

The contrast between the living conditions of workers and their employers the mine-owners and ironmasters was stark, although entertainment interests sometimes overlapped: both workers and employers flocked to the Swansea horse races, for example, held at Crymlyn Burrows. In addition to the racing, this was also the scene of boxing, gambling, cock-fighting, shows and drinking—apparently the temperance movement had not yet taken hold. Swansea also became a focus for literary and cultural life in South Wales. In 1835 a philosophical and literary society was established, which became the Royal Institution of South Wales in 1841, based in the first purpose-built museum building in Wales. Swansea hosted the annual meetings of the British Association for the Advancement of Science in 1848 and 1880 (Miskell, 2004).

Victorian slums and reform
In order to allow boats to dock without running aground at low tide and to remain afloat, the "Float" was constructed: the Tawe was diverted and a new dock with locks created. Work began in 1852, and the result was New Dock in 1859. Further changes to the docks were proposed, and the town authorities realised the potential grave effect on public health, particular in the riverside St Thomas area. Drinking water came from springs locally but clean water sources were increasingly rare.  Cholera broke out in 1832; and again in 1849.

There was no sewerage system in Swansea until 1857 and the water supply in areas above the reservoir level was "in many cases of a questionable character" (contemporary report quoted by Dean). The Lliw reservoir of 1863 helped provide clean water, but drainage of dirty water was still a problem.

In 1865, Swansea suffered an epidemic of yellow fever, the only outbreak of that disease on the British mainland. A cargo of copper ore from Cuba was landed in exceptionally hot weather in September, and with it a number of infected mosquitoes. In a month, 27 inhabitants were infected and 15 died.

Swansea saw yet another outbreak of cholera in 1866 and the local authorities were eventually forced by legislation to act. The only way to improve some areas was wholesale slum clearance, and this was the solution imposed in several regions of Swansea, notably Greenhill (current Dyfatty and Alexandra Road area), an area with massive overcrowding and consequent disproportionate incidence of cholera cases. It was populated largely by Irish immigrants, many of whom had fled the potato famines.  Several of the landlords of Greenhill making great profits from their rents, and who required recompense for the loss of their properties, were local dignitaries, including Lewis Llewelyn Dillwyn, MP. (Dean)

Sewage and pollution were also part of the cause of the decline of the oyster trade centred on Mumbles, also known as Oystermouth.  Kilvert's diary described a thriving and ancient industry in 1872; within five years, it had almost completely collapsed.

Industrial decline
The construction of the Taff Vale Railway and the Bute West Dock in the 1840s resulted in Cardiff surpassing Swansea as the principal coal port in South Wales, and by 1871 Cardiff's population exceeded that of Swansea. In the late 19th century, Swansea copper smelters faced increased foreign competition, and some of the leading smelters in the region diversified into other non-ferrous metals. In the ferrous sector, rapid growth in demand for tinplate - particularly in the USA - facilitated a local boom; the imposition of the McKinley Tariff in 1891 caused a significant fall in production, but tinplate continued to be a significant local economic activity into the first half of the 20th century, with demand buoyant during the two world wars.

During the Second World War, Swansea's Queen's Dock was one end of the world's first test of a full-scale submarine oil pipeline, in Operation Pluto. Swansea was a target for Nazi German bombing raids due to its industries, the port, and railways. By the end of the so-called Three Nights' Blitz, three consecutive nights of particularly intensive bombing in February 1941, the town centre was flattened, along with many residential streets.  Rebuilding post-war was in typical British nineteen-fifties style and much of the result is regarded with high favour by neither residents nor visitors. One consequence of the bombing and rebuilding is the movement of the town centre by about half a mile. Pre-war, the town centre was on an axis around High Street and Wind Street. Post-war, Oxford Street and the new road the Kingsway took more prominence.

The Mumbles Railway was closed in 1960. By 1960, industry in the valley was in steep decline and the landscape was littered with abandoned metalworks and the waste from them. The Lower Swansea Valley Scheme was started: an attempt to reclaim the polluted land into something usable. The Enterprise Zone at Llansamlet is built on part of this land. Further down the river, the Tawe was diverted—again—and the Parc Tawe development sits on top of the old North Dock. The old South Dock area now holds the Leisure Centre and Marina.

See also
 Swansea
 History of Wales
 List of Scheduled Monuments in Swansea
 Swansea Vale Railway
 Swansea and Mumbles Railway

References

Bibliography
 Lower Swansea Valley  series of factsheets, numbers 1 to 8 Swansea Museum Services
 Copperopolis: landscapes of the early industrial period in Swansea, Stephen Hughes, 2005 (reprint)  
 Miskell, L. (2004) Swansea Bay 1904, Old Ordnance Survey Maps. England & Wales Sheet 247

External links
 Swansea heritage net: major project to digitise important pieces in Swansea Museum Service's collection.
 Cable Tramway: Details of the Swansea Constitution Hill cable tramway.
 British History Online: Steynton - Swydd
 BBC Wales Memories of the Swansea Blitz
 BBC Wales history of the Swansea Blitz
 The Swansea blitz on Gathering the Jewels